Les Richardson (9 January 1887 – 15 November 1962) was an Australian cricketer. He played one first-class match for Tasmania in 1921/22.

See also
 List of Tasmanian representative cricketers

References

External links
 

1887 births
1962 deaths
Australian cricketers
Tasmania cricketers
Cricketers from Hobart